The following is a list of all suspensions and fines enforced in the National Hockey League during the 2013–14 NHL season. It lists which players or coaches of what team have been punished for which offense and the amount of punishment they have received.

Based on each player's average annual salary, divided by number of days in the season (195) for non-repeat offenders and games (82) for repeat offenders, salary will be forfeited for the term of their suspension. Players' money forfeited due to suspension or fine goes to the Players' Emergency Assistance Fund, while money forfeited by coaches, staff or organizations as a whole go to the NHL Foundation.

Suspensions
† - suspension covered at least one 2013 NHL pre-season game

* - Incident happened in the pre-season, but the player was allowed to take part in the remainder of the pre-season before serving his suspension in the regular season.

‡ - suspension covered at least one 2014 post-season game

# - Suspension was later reduced upon further review/successful appeal; information presented in italics.

 Suspension was appealed to Commissioner Gary Bettman who upheld the 10 game ruling.
 Suspension was appealed to Mister Bettman who upheld the 15 game ruling.
 Suspension will be served at the beginning of any new contract. The suspension is accompanied by mandatory referral to the NHL/NHLPA Program for Substance Abuse and Behavioral Health.

Fines
Players can be fined up to 50% of one day's salary, up to a maximum of $10,000.00 U.S. for their first offense, and $15,000.00 U.S. for any subsequent offenses. Fines listed in italics indicate that was the maximum allowed fine.

Further reading

See also 
 2013 in sports
 2014 in sports
 2013 NHL Entry Draft
 2013–14 NHL season
 2013–14 NHL transactions
 2013–14 NHL Three Star Awards
 2012–13 NHL suspensions and fines

References

Suspension And Fines
National Hockey League suspensions and fines